Fire Bird is the tenth studio album by Japanese musician Miyavi. It was released on 31 August 2016 in Japan. It charted 11th on Oricon and on Billboard Japan.

Release 
The album was followed up by a nationwide tour MIYAVI Japan Tour 2016 "NEW BEAT, NEW FUTURE", which included 10 stops. The last performance was held at Makuhari Messe, and was broadcast live on Abema TV, with more than 100,000 viewers watching.

Track listing

Personnel 
Credits are adapted from the album's liner notes.

 Miyavi - vocals (1-4, 6-10), guitar (all tracks), writer (all tracks)
 Austin Massirman - backing vocals (1-4, 6-10) 
 Lenny Skolnik - backing vocals (1-4, 6-10)
 Tony Rodini - backing vocals (1, 2, 4, 6-10)
 Jonny Litten - keyboard (1-7, 10)
 Bobo - drums (1, 3, 4, 6)
 Brendan Buckley - drums (2, 5, 7, 10)
 Rosie Bones - vocals (3)
 Meron Ryan - backing vocals (2, 4, 7, 8, 10)
 Seann Bowe - backing vocals (2, 4)
 Sidnie Tipton - backing vocals (2, 4, 7, 8, 10)
 Doc Brittain - backing vocals (9), drums (9)
 Nick Long - writer (5)
 Meron Ryan - backing vocals (2, 4, 7-10)
 Adam-Kapit - keyboards (7), vocals (7), 
 Melody - backing vocals (8-10)
 Ras - backing vocals (9)
 Elizabeth Cunningham - backing vocals (9)
 Ilan Kidron - backing vocals (9)
 Hatsukazu Hatch Inagaki - engineer
 Shojiro Watanabe - additional engineer (1-4, 6)
 Carl Stoodt - assistant enginner
 Shaun Ezrol - assistant engineer
 Howie Weinberg - mastering engineer (all tracks)
 Chris Lord-Alge - mixing engineer (1-3, 5-10)
 Jon Kaplan - mixing engineer (4)

References

External links 
 Fire Bird at Discogs

2016 albums
Miyavi albums
Virgin Records albums